Red Hat is a software corporation.

Red hat or Red Hat may also refer to:

Computing and technology
 Red Hat Enterprise Linux, a computer operating system
 Red Hat Linux, a computer operating system

Groups and organizations
 Red Hat (U.S. military operation), the deployment, relocation, and storage of U.S. chemical weapons in the Pacific during the Cold War linked to Project 112; Operation Red Hat; "Red Hats", the participants of; Red Hat Area, Johnston Atoll;  
 Red Hat sect(s), three different schools of Tibetan Buddhism
 Red Hat Society, a social organization traditionally for women over 50

Other uses
 Red Hat, a metaphorical hat representing emotional thinking, in Edward de Bono's book Six Thinking Hats
 Red hat, a trainee in a volunteer fire department
Red Hat, a member of a fictitious SS-like force in Colony
 Galero, a red hat traditionally worn by cardinals of the Catholic Church
 Red Hat Cell Block, a prison cell block at the Louisiana State Penitentiary
 Slang appellation for supporters of the Make America Great Again movement

See also
 Redcap (disambiguation)
 Red beret